"On Your Own" is a song by English rock band Blur. It was released as a single on 16 June 1997 from the band's fifth studio album, Blur (1997). It charted at number five on the UK Singles Chart. Although it was not released exclusively under the name, Damon Albarn, frontman of both musical projects, has since referred the song as 'one of the first ever Gorillaz tunes'.

Music video
The music video for "On Your Own" was directed by Sophie Muller and recorded in Barcelona, in what at the time was an industrial site, by the Besos Water Tower.

B-sides
The B-sides were all recorded at John Peel's home studio: Peel Acres. They were previously broadcast on BBC Radio 1 on 8 May 1997. Stickered copies of CD1 and the white vinyl 7-inch features the text 'includes POPSCENE'. This is because "Popscene" did not appear on the UK version of Modern Life is Rubbish and was, therefore, rare and sought after by fans until its inclusion on Midlife: A Beginner's Guide to Blur. The version that appears here merges into "Song 2". All of Blur's Peel Sessions were later released on the second disc of the Japan only compilation Bustin' + Dronin', an album that features three versions of "On Your Own".

Track listings
All music was composed by Damon Albarn, Graham Coxon, Alex James, and Dave Rowntree. All lyrics were written by Albarn.

UK CD1
 "On Your Own"
 "Popscene" (live at Peel)
 "Song 2" (live at Peel Acres)
 "On Your Own" (live at Peel Acres)

UK CD2
 "On Your Own"
 "Chinese Bombs" (live at Peel Acres)
 "Movin' On" (live at Peel Acres)
 "M.O.R." (live at Peel Acres)

UK limited-edition 7-inch clear vinyl single
A1. "On Your Own"
B1. "Popscene" (live at Peel Acres)
B2. "Song 2" (live at Peel Acres)

Australian CD single  ("On Your Own" / "Popscene")
 "On Your Own" – 4:27
 "Popscene" – 3:14
 "Death of a Party" (Well Blurred remix)
 "Death of a Party" (Billy Whisker's mix)

Personnel
 Damon Albarn – lead vocals, synthesizers, acoustic guitar
 Graham Coxon – electric guitar, backing vocals
 Alex James – bass guitar
 Dave Rowntree – drums, drum machine

Charts

Weekly charts

Year-end charts

In popular culture
The song is used in the film The Beach (2000) and appears on the soundtrack to the film.

References

Blur (band) songs
1997 singles
Food Records singles
Music videos directed by Sophie Muller
Parlophone singles
Song recordings produced by Stephen Street
Songs written by Alex James (musician)
Songs written by Damon Albarn
Songs written by Dave Rowntree
Songs written by Graham Coxon